Seetayya is a 2003 Indian Telugu-language  action drama film directed by Y. V. S. Chowdary and written by Posani Krishna Murali. It stars late Nandamuri Harikrishna son of late Nandamuri Taraka Ramarao as lead actor and late Soundarya, Simran as co-stars.  Music for the movie was well received and composed by M.M. Keeravani.

Plot

A powerful cop Seetayya (Hari Krishna) wants to put an end to the ruthless factions in Rayalaseema. He tries to stop two warring factionist families in Dharmavaram from killing each other. Bangaram (Simran) Comes to seetayya's house by accident and falls in love with him. meanwhile the factionist families come to know of seetayya's past, Rest of the story is about seetayya solving the issues and bringing about peace in Rayalaseema.

Cast
 Nandamuri Harikrishna as Seetayya / Sivayya
 Soundarya as Seeta
 Simran as Bangaram / Pentamma
 Mukesh Rishi as Venkat Naidu
 Rahul Dev as Chandra Naidu 
 Ravi Prakash as Srinivas Naidu
 Jaya Prakash Reddy as Sarvarayudu
 Posani Krishna Murali as Anjanappa
 Mohan Raj as Choudappa
 Kanta Rao
 Balayya
 Ahuti Prasad
 Rajan P Dev as Sivayya's father
 Devan
 Nalini
 Satya Prakash
 Subhashini
 Vindhya
 Brahmanandam as Koti 
 Ali
 M. S. Narayana
 Dharmavarapu Subramanyam
 Mallikarjuna Rao
 G. V. Sudhakar Naidu
 Rama Prabha
 Sunitha Verma
 Kolla Ashok Kumar

Soundtrack
The music was composed by M. M. Keeravani and released by Aditya Music.

Awards
S. P. Balasubrahmanyam won Nandi Award for Best Male Playback Singer for the song "Idhigo Rayalaseemagadda"

References

External links
 

2002 films
2000s Telugu-language films
Indian action films
Films scored by M. M. Keeravani
2000s masala films
Films with screenplays by Posani Krishna Murali
Films directed by Y. V. S. Chowdary
2002 action films